Rho protein may refer to:
 Rho GTPase, a member of Rho family of GTPases
 Rho factor, a bacterial protein involved in transcription termination